Kapilvastu (also known by name of Taulihawa) is a municipality and administrative center of Kapilvastu District in Lumbini Province of southern Nepal.

Kapilvastu Municipality was established in 1982 with the name of Taulihawa Nagarpanchayat merging Baragdawa, Maalpara, Pipari, Kapilvastu Adarsh Gaau and some portion of Tilaurakot, Gotihawa and Gobari Gaunpanchayat. Later on 7 November 2014 remaining region of Gotihawa and Tilaurakot VDC were included making total 19 wards within this Municipality.

On March 10, 2017, the Government of Nepal restructured the local level bodies into 753 new local level structures.
The previous Taulihawa Municipality with Dharampaniya, Dohani, Jahadi, Nigalihawa and Sauraha VDCs were merged to form Kapilvastu Municipality. The municipality is now divided into 12 wards.

History

Many historians claim Tilaurakot located in Kapilavastu municipality (Taulihawa) to be the ancient city of Kapilavastu. On the other hand, some other archaeologists have identified present-day Piprahwa, India as the location for the historical site of Kapilavastu. The 19th-century search for the historical site of Kapilavastu followed the accounts left by Faxian and later by Xuanzang, who were Chinese Buddhist monks who made early pilgrimages to the site.
Kapilavastu was an ancient city and the capital city of the Shakya kingdom.
King Śuddhodana and Queen Māyā are believed to have lived at Kapilavastu, as did their son Prince Siddartha Gautama until he left the palace at the age of 29.

Historical sites

There are many sites of historical interest in or very close to Kapilavastu, including:

Amaulikot
Arourakot Darbar
Bardahawa
Bargadawa Stupa
Bikulikot
Derwa Stupa
Dohanikot
Gotihawa, birthplace of Kakusandha Buddha, marked by an Ashoka pillar
Jagdishpur Reservoir
Kanthak Stupa
Kapilvastu Museum
Kopawa Stupa
Nigrodharama, the ruins of a Buddhist monastery where Gautama Buddha is believed to have stayed when visiting Kapilavastu
Lohasariya Stupa
Lumbini, the birthplace of Gautama Buddha
Nigali Sagar, an archeological site in Nigalihawa, birthplace of Koṇāgamana Buddha, marked by an Ashoka pillar
Paltimai Temple
Pipara Stupa
Pipari
Piprahwa, a village and archaeological site in Siddharthnagar district, Uttar Pradesh, India that may be one of the burial sites of a portion of the ashes of Gautama Buddha
Premnagar Stupa
Ramagrama stupa, believed to be the only intact and original stupa containing relics of Buddha
Rampur Siddhipur Stupa
Sagarahawa Reservoir
Sarkup Pokhari
Semara Shiv Mandir
Sihokhor Stupa
Siseniya Stupa
Tauleshwor Nath Mandir (Shree Tauleshwor Nath Mandir) is a devotional temple for Hindus. Many Hindus come here to worship Shiva during the Maha Shivaratri festival.
Tilaurakot
Twin Stupa

See also
Kumarwarti

Notes

External links
 Lumbini On Trial: The Untold Story by Terry Phelps. See Section 'The Kapilavastu of the Chinese Pilgrims' and following passage also.

Buddhist pilgrimage sites in Nepal
Gautama Buddha
Populated places in Kapilvastu District
Transit and customs posts along the India–Nepal border
Municipalities in Lumbini Province
Nepal municipalities established in 1982
Archaeological sites in Nepal